Ng Aik Leong, better known by his Chinese name Huang Yiliang,  is a former veteran Singaporean television actor and director. He was a full-time Mediacorp artiste from 1980 to 2006, after which he decide not to renew after the contract ends.

Acting career
Huang started as an actor with Mediacorp. He won the Best Supporting Actor Star Awards three times and Top 10 Most Popular Male Artistes during his 20-year career there. Huang left the entertainment industry in 2006.

Huang felt that it was time to move on to a different challenge after having acted for the past 20 years and started his own movie producing company Red Group Film and became a movie producer, a film-director and a movie actor.

Huang's first production, Autumn In March (2009) (S$1 million budget), was originally scheduled for big screen but was later downgraded to just DVD-release after failing to get the support of the local movie distributors. However, it did receive overwhelming support from aspiring actresses as more than 300 girls came over for the leading actress audition in Singapore. 

On 30 August 2012, Huang released his second movie production, My Ghost Partner, which had a gross box office collection of S$24,833.

Personal life 
Huang married Singaporean actress Lin Meijiao in 1991 and have a daughter Chantalle Ng in 1995. They however divorced in 1997 wherein Lin initiated it and she has custody of their daughter.

He dedicated one of his Star Awards to Lin, in which he ranted in the televised award ceremony.

On 30 November 2020, Huang appeared in a court trial and was accused of attacking a Bangladeshi worker, Jahidul, with a metal scraper at the Singapore Islamic Hub in December 2018, having been charged on 29 November the previous year. The worker was an employee of HYL Enterprises, a plumbing company which was owned by Huang. During the trial, audio recordings revealed that Huang had frequent angry, verbal outbursts against Jahidul, causing the worker to live in fear while working for Huang. On 11 December 2018, Huang then had another violent outburst against Jahidul for not using enough string to tie a plastic bag over a rubbish pail, which eventually led to his attack on Jahidul with a metal scraper. In court, he claimed that he established an agreement with Jahidul to allow him to hit the worker "to help (him) improve at work", and that the assault was merely play-acting. However, the prosecutor dismissed the explanation as "ridiculous" and issued Huang a warning against contempt of court. On 22 January 2021, Huang was convicted of "voluntarily causing hurt by a dangerous weapon" to Jahidul and is awaiting sentencing. On 26 February 2021, the court found him guilty and he was sentenced to 10 months imprisonment. Huang filed an appeal to lower the sentence, but it was dismissed on 4 February 2022 and he began serving his sentence immediately.

Filmography

Movies

Television series

Accolades

References

Singaporean television personalities
Living people
Singaporean male film actors
Singaporean male television actors
1960 births
20th-century Singaporean male actors
21st-century Singaporean male actors